The 2020 Monte Carlo Rally (also known as the 88e Rallye Automobile Monte-Carlo) was a motor racing event for rally cars that was held over four days between 23 and 26 January 2020. It marked the eighty-eighth running of the Monte Carlo Rally, and was the first round of the 2020 World Rally Championship, World Rally Championship-2 and World Rally Championship-3. The 2020 event was based in the town of Gap in the Hautes-Alpes department of France and consisted of sixteen special stages.

Sébastien Ogier and Julien Ingrassia were the defending rally winners. The Citroën World Rally Team, the team they drove for in 2019, were the reigning manufacturers' winners, but were not defending their title after parent company Citroën withdrew from the sport. Gus Greensmith and Elliott Edmondson were the defending winners in the World Rally Championship-2 category, but were not defending their WRC-2 title as they joined the WRC category in 2020. In the World Rally Championship-3 category, French privateers Yoann Bonato and Benjamin Boulloud were the reigning rally winners.

Thierry Neuville and Nicolas Gilsoul were the overall winners of the rally, winning the Monte Carlo rally for the first time. Their team, Hyundai Shell Mobis WRT, were the manufacturers' winners. Mads Østberg and Torstein Eriksen were the winners in the WRC-2 category, while Eric Camilli and François-Xavier Buresi were the winners in the WRC-3 category.

Background

Entry list
The following crews were entered into the rally. The event was open to crews competing in the World Rally Championship, its support categories, the World Rally Championship-2 and World Rally Championship-3, and privateer entries that were not registered to score points in any championship. A total of eighty-eight entries were received, with eleven crews entered in World Rally Cars, five crews entered Group R5 cars in the World Rally Championship-2 and a further thirteen crews entered Group R5 cars in the World Rally Championship-3.

Route
The 2020 route features substantial revisions to the route used in 2019, with the addition of the Malijal — Puimichel, Curbans — Venterol and St. Clement-sur-Durance — Freissinieres stages. The Bayons — Bréziers stage returned to the rally after being absent in 2019, while the Valdrôme — Sigottier and Roussieux — Laborel stages were removed from the itinerary.

Itinerary

All dates and times are CET (UTC+1).

Report

World Rally Cars
Sébastien Ogier and Julien Ingrassia took an early lead on Thursday evening, but Thierry Neuville and Nicolas Gilsoul moved into the lead at the end of the second stage. The lead changed hands several times throughout the opening leg; Elfyn Evans and Scott Martin took the lead on the first morning before Ogier and Ingrassia consolidated their position by the end of the leg. Defending World Champions Ott Tänak and Martin Järveoja suffered a high-speed crash on the first pass through the St. Clement-sur-Durance — Freissinieres stage. Both Tänak and Järveoja walked away uninjured. Rally leaders changed several times throughout the second leg, with Evans and Martin eventually establishing a lead over teammates Ogier and Ingrassia. The third leg saw Neuville and Gilsoul re-emerge as the leaders, winning all four stages to claim their first win in Monte Carlo. This saw them take twenty-five points for the outright win and five bonus points for winning the Power Stage. Ogier and Ingrassia passed Evans and Martin to finish the Power Stage in second place, only a few thousandths of a second behind Neuville and Gilsoul.

Classification

Special stages

Championship standings

World Rally Championship-2
Mads Østberg and Torstein Eriksenled the WRC-2 category going into Friday, but a puncture cost him the lead. Ole Christian Veiby and Jonas Andersson then took over the lead until later they also suffered a puncture, which handed the lead back to Østberg and Eriksen. The Norwegian crew extended their lead on Saturday, and eventually won the class.

Classification

Special stages

Championship standings

World Rally Championship-3
Eric Camilli and François-Xavier Buresi held a 21-second lead over Stéphane Sarrazin and Kévin Parent by the end of Thursday night. Friday's complicated conditions caught out several crews, including those of Sarrazin and Parent, Paulo Nobre and Gabriel Morales, and Umberto Scandola and Guido D'Amore. Camilli and Buresi comfortably won the category after a perfect weekend.

Classification

Special stages

Championship standings

Notes

References

External links

  
 2020 Monte Carlo Rally at ewrc-results.com
 The official website of the World Rally Championship

2020 in French motorsport
2020 in Monégasque sport
2020 World Rally Championship season
January 2020 sports events in France
2020